Chakab or Chekab may refer to:
 Chakab, Razavi Khorasan
 Chekab, South Khorasan